100% Electronica is the debut album by American electronic musician George Clanton, released on September 25, 2015 by his independent record label 100% Electronica.

Production
Although Clanton had previously released albums as Mirror Kisses and ESPRIT 空想, 100% Electronica is the first album released under his real name which attempts to combine the sounds of his previous records.

Reception

100% Electronica has received favorable reviews from music critics. Michael Tyler wrote for Study Breaks that the album "displays Clanton's ability to create soaring and dramatic pop music as both a songwriter and producer." Natalia Morawski from Acid Stag wrote, "100% Electronica is a gorgeous, glossy combustion of the old and new", and that "it's boisterous and coloured by the best of 80s post-disco funk. Even his vocals are a nod to bands like Tears and Fears, but Clanton's vocals don't cut through as clearly as one would have in a pop song, but rather his vocals are an instrument themselves, a charm Clanton has retained from his previous DIY-pop records. [...] this is Clanton at his most structured". Gorilla vs. Bear wrote, "[Clanton] seems to have a similar uncanny knack as artists like John Maus and Ariel Pink for creating soaring, unabashedly dramatic classic pop". Tim Gagnon of Flood Magazine wrote, "100% [Electronica] was Clanton at both his most accessible and alien, reaching for the stratosphere with his histrionic croon tied to pop choruses."
Critics compared its sound to 1980's synth-pop acts such as Tears for Fears and New Order. Fact selected 100% Electronica as their "Bandcamp Release Of The Month" for September 2015. The column's editor, Miles Bowe wrote, "100% Electronica often sounds like what chillwave could have used before it imploded. An artist who is serious and funny and committed in all the ways the artists who failed the genre weren't."

Track listing

References

External links
 100% Electronica at 100% Electronica
 100% Electronica at Discogs

2015 debut albums
George Clanton albums